A boride is a compound between boron and a less electronegative element, for example silicon boride (SiB3 and SiB6). The borides are a very large group of compounds that are generally high melting and are covalent more than ionic in nature. Some borides exhibit very useful physical properties. The term boride is also loosely applied to compounds such as B12As2 (N.B. Arsenic has an electronegativity higher than boron) that is often referred to as icosahedral boride.

Ranges of compounds
The borides can be classified loosely as boron rich or metal rich, for example the compound YB66 at one extreme through to Nd2Fe14B at the other. The generally accepted definition is that if the ratio of boron atoms to metal atoms is 4:1 or more, the compound is boron rich; if it is less, then it is metal rich.

Boron rich borides (B:M 4:1 or more)
The main group metals, lanthanides and actinides form a wide variety of boron-rich borides, with metal:boron ratios up to YB66.
 
The properties of this group vary from one compound to the next, and include examples of compounds that are semi conductors, superconductors, diamagnetic, paramagnetic, ferromagnetic or anti-ferromagnetic. They are mostly stable and refractory.

Some metallic dodecaborides contain boron icosahedra, others (for example yttrium, zirconium and uranium) have the boron atoms arranged in cuboctahedra.

LaB6 is an inert refractory compound, used in hot cathodes because of its low work function which gives it a high rate of thermionic emission of electrons; YB66 crystals, grown by an indirect-heating floating zone method, are used as monochromators for low-energy synchrotron X-rays.

Metal rich borides (B:M less than 4:1)
The transition metals tend to form metal rich borides. Metal-rich borides, as a group, are inert and have high melting temperature. Some are easily formed and this explains their use in making turbine blades, rocket nozzles, etc. Some examples include AlB2 and TiB2. Recent investigations into this class of borides have revealed a wealth of interesting properties such as super conductivity at 39 K in MgB2 and the ultra-incompressibility of OsB2 and ReB2.

Boride structures
The boron rich borides contain 3-dimensional frameworks of boron atoms that can include boron polyhedra.
The metal rich borides contain single boron atoms, B2 units, boron chains or boron sheets/layers.

Examples of the different types of borides are:
isolated boron atoms, example Mn4B
B2 units, example V3B
chains of boron atoms, example FeB
sheets or layers of boron atoms CrB2
3-dimensional boron frameworks that include boron polyhedra, example NaB15 with boron icosahedra

See also
Crystal structure of boron-rich metal borides
Iron tetraboride
Yttrium borides - a representative class of metal borides
Magnesium diboride - a superconductor

References

Books